Bridgetowne is a real estate development spanning the border of Pasig and Quezon City in Metro Manila, the Philippines. It is a mixed township and business park situated in a former industrial area on both banks of the Marikina River near the junction of Eulogio Rodriguez Jr. Avenue (C-5 Road) and Ortigas Avenue. The  masterplanned community is the first integrated township project by Robinsons Land Corporation, the real estate arm of JG Summit. It is currently anchored by four office towers in its information technology park dedicated to the business process outsourcing sector, its second in Metro Manila after Robinsons Cybergate in Mandaluyong. Once completed, the township will be a community consisting of seven office towers, a shopping mall, five-star hotel and residential condominiums, with a landmark bridge and a light art installation called The Victor as its centerpiece.

Location
 
Bridgetowne straddles the dividing line between Quezon City and Pasig and is divided into two tracts by the Marikina River. The majority of the development, the  Bridgetowne East, sits on the eastern bank of the river within an area of Pasig administered as part of the village of Rosario.
This area bounded by Amang Rodriguez Avenue to the east is a densely populated residential and industrial area in close proximity to the Manggahan Floodway. The  Bridgetowne West occupies the Quezon City side of the township where it is bordered by Eulogio Rodriguez Jr. Avenue (C-5 Road) to the west. This area in Ugong Norte is a major transportation corridor that links Ortigas Center and Eastwood City. It neighbors the Parklinks development on both banks of the Marikina River to the north and the Alaska Land IT Center to the south, with Green Meadows and Valle Verde gated villages forming its western border across C-5. The township is also a stone's throw from the Ortigas East, The Grove by Rockwell and Arcovia City mixed-use developments of C-5 just south of Ortigas Avenue.

History
Bridgetowne is a redevelopment of several former industrial properties along the Marikina River in Rosario and Ugong Norte. The eight-hectare Quezon City property was acquired by Robinsons Land in 2011, two hectares of which was purchased from Republic Glass Holdings Corp. which operated a glass manufacturing facility at the location. In April 2013, Robinsons Land announced a  business park development for the property, its second after the Robinsons Cybergate development. The company topped off its first office building in the eight-hectare Bridgetowne Business Park in Quezon City, the 20-storey Tera Tower, in November 2014.

On September 5, 2019, the business park was rebranded as simply Bridgetowne, Robinsons Land's first township in the country, now covering 30.61 hectares. The 200-meter long Bridgetowne Bridge also opened to the public linking its Quezon City IT park component to the new 22.56-hectare Pasig redevelopment site added to the township. The Pasig property covers the former Rosario Plant, a food processing plant of JG Summit subsidiary Universal Robina, and Litton Knitting Mills, a  textile manufacturing complex which stood at the site since 1954 and which JG Summit purchased in the 1970s. 

In December 2019, another hectare was added to the township through a joint acquisition of the former Red Ribbon Bakeshop commissary on C-5 Road adjacent to the property by Robinsons Land and DoubleDragon Properties.

Developments

Opus Mall
Formerly named as Robinsons Bridgetowne, it is an upscale retail development developed and managed by Robinsons Malls, located at the Quezon City side of the development. It also serves as the podium of the upcoming Fili Hotel, its first branch in Metro Manila and the second after NUSTAR Cebu. The mall is expected to open in the second half of 2023, after being delayed due to the COVID-19 pandemic.

Robinsons DoubleDragon Square
A redevelopment of the former one-hectare Red Ribbon Bakeshop commissary building on C-5 Road by the 50-50 percent joint venture of Robinsons Land and DoubleDragon Properties. The  mixed retail and office development will occupy two-thirds of the Red Ribbon lot and will provide  of gross leasable space.

The Victor
The colossal public art piece is expected to be one of the tallest lighting projection art installations in the world. It was inspired by the company's founder, John Gokongwei, who "despite the challenging early part of his life, emerged victorious by building a successful and huge conglomerate" in the Philippines. The marine-grade perforated steel art piece is also said to symbolize unity, hope, strength and success of ordinary Filipinos. It is slated for completion by Q1 2021.

Office developments
Bridgetowne West is a Philippine Economic Zone Authority-registered IT park that is planned to contain seven office towers catering to the business process outsourcing industry. In February 2020, Robinsons Land started construction on its first office development in Bridgetowne East.

Campus One
Robinsons Land announced its first office tower development for the Bridgetowne East property in Pasig in February 2020. It is slated for completion by Q3 2020.

Tera Tower
Tera Tower is a 20-story LEED-registered office building in Bridgetowne West. It is the first office development of Robinsons Land in its eight-hectare cyberpark which was completed in November 2014. It hosts the headquarters of Universal Robina, a sister company of Robinsons Land.

Exxa and Zeta Towers
Robinsons Land topped off its second office tower in the Bridgetowne cyberpark in February 2018. Zeta Tower, a 20-story green office building, has  of office gross leasable area and will also host around 20 retail establishments. A contact center of Hinduja Global Solutions is located at Zeta Tower. Its twin, Exxa Tower, was completed later that year, and now hosts a contact center of American business services company Concentrix.

Giga Tower
Robinsons Land's fourth office tower development in Bridgetowne is the 29-story Giga Tower located beside Tera Tower.

Residential developments

Cirrus
Cirrus is a 40-story residential condominium high-rise under construction in the Bridgetowne East section of the township. It is a development of Robinsons Communities and will feature 1,500 studio units.

The Velaris Residences
The Velaris Residences is a  luxury condominium development by RHK Land Corporation, a joint venture of Robinsons Land and Hongkong Land. It is a 45-story glass-and-concrete tower on a  piece of land in Bridgetowne East with a target completion date of 2024.

Haraya Residences
Haraya Residences, is a twin tower condominium development by Shang Properties and Robinsons Land. The condominium is located at Riverside Drive cor. Bridgetowne Boulevard. It is Shang Properties' second collaboration with Robinsons Land after Aurelia Residences.

Le Pont Residences
Le Pont Residences is an A-grade, 50-story twin tower condominium development. The building will have a parking lot that is Tesla-ready.

References

Mixed-use developments in Metro Manila
Buildings and structures in Pasig
Buildings and structures in Quezon City
Redeveloped ports and waterfronts in the Philippines
Planned communities in the Philippines